P.S. 66 Jacqueline Kennedy Onassis School, formally known as Brooklyn Hills School, is a historic school building in Richmond Hill, Queens, New York.  It was designed by architect C. B. J. Snyder (1860–1945) and built in 1898.  It is a -story brick structure in the Romanesque style.  It has a prominent, off-center tower with belfry.  It features a slate roof and decorative stucco frieze. The school has a fortress-like appearance, including prominent round arches highlighting window openings, and a distinctive six-story tower. The building was restored in 2001 and remains in use as a New York City Public School.

P.S. 66 is also a relic from the time when Richmond Hill was a farming community, and was transitioning into an urban residential neighborhood.

It was listed on the National Register of Historic Places in 2003. In 2008, Caroline Kennedy petitioned the New York City Council to make P.S. 66 into a New York City designated landmark. It was listed as a New York City landmark in 2010.

See also
List of New York City Designated Landmarks in Queens
National Register of Historic Places listings in Queens County, New York

References

External links
"Astoria Residents Tour Steinway Mansion," The Queens Gazette, By Jason D. Antos, October 13, 2010.

New York City Designated Landmarks in Queens, New York
School buildings on the National Register of Historic Places in New York City
Romanesque Revival architecture in New York City
School buildings completed in 1898
Richmond Hill, Queens
National Register of Historic Places in Queens, New York